Alli Ramachari Illi Brahmachari (Kannada: ಅಲ್ಲಿ ರಾಮಾಚಾರಿ ಇಲ್ಲಿ ಬ್ರಹ್ಮಚಾರಿ) is a 1992 Indian Kannada film directed by B. Ramamurthy. The film stars Jaggesh in a double role along with Swathi Ganguly, Prathibha and Abhijith. The music was scored by Hamsalekha. Thriller Manju worked as the stunt director.

Cast
Jaggesh
Swathi Ganguli
Prathibha
Abhijeeth
Disco Shanti
Killer Venkatesh 
Shankanaada Aravind 
Paapamma 
Navaneetha 
Doddanna 
Srinivas Murthy

Reception

References

1992 films
1990s Kannada-language films
Films scored by V. Manohar